The Circuito del Jarama (Circuit of Jarama), formerly known as Circuito Permanente del Jarama (Permanent circuit of Jarama) is a motorsport racetrack located in San Sebastián de los Reyes, 20 miles (32 km) north of Madrid. It was home to the Spanish Grand Prix nine times between 1968 and 1981, and the Spanish motorcycle Grand Prix 15 times between 1969 and 1988.

Designed by John Hugenholtz (who also created Suzuka), the  circuit was built by Alessandro Rocci in 1967 on arid scrub land.

History

It has a short main straight and most of the course consisted of tight, twisty corners so overtaking was extremely difficult. An example of this came when Gilles Villeneuve successfully defended his lead throughout the 1981 Spanish Grand Prix, despite a tail of four potentially faster cars. Villeneuve's turbocharged Ferrari 126CK, while powerful and fast on the straight, did not have as efficient ground effect aerodynamics as his pursuers - Jacques Laffite (V12 Ligier-Matra), John Watson (McLaren-Ford), Carlos Reutemann (Williams-Ford), and Elio de Angelis (Lotus-Ford) and was slower through the turns. This victory was to be the last one of Villeneuve's career.

Jarama hosted its last Formula One race in 1981 when it was deemed too narrow for modern racing. It still holds sports car, touring car and motorcycle races. The circuit was lengthened in 1991, and then upgraded in 2015.

In 1987, Jarama hosted Round 2 of the inaugural World Touring Car Championship for Group A cars, the 1987 Jarama 4 Hours. The race was won by Roberto Ravaglia and Emanuele Pirro driving a Schnitzer Motorsport BMW M3. Pole position for the race had been taken by triple Le Mans 24 Hour winner Klaus Ludwig in a Ford Sierra RS Cosworth turbo with a time of 1:31.434, while the fastest lap was by England's Andy Rouse (also in a Sierra Cosworth) with a time of 1:33.710.

Layout history

Events

 Current

 April: TCR Spain Campeonato de España de Superturismos
 June: SuperCars Endurance Series Supercars en Jarama
 October: FIA European Truck Racing Championship GP Camiones de España

 Former

 BPR Global GT Series (1994–1996)
 EuroBOSS Series (2008)
 European Formula Two Championship (1967–1969, 1971, 1983)
 European Touring Car Championship (1968–1972, 1974–1979, 1985–1986, 1988, 2001–2002)
 F4 Spanish Championship (2016, 2020)
 FIA European Formula 3 Championship (1977–1984)
 FIA ETCR – eTouring Car World Cup (2022)
 FIA GT Championship (2001–2002)
 FIM Endurance World Championship (1969, 1983)
 Formula 750 (1974, 1976–1978)
 Formula One Spanish Grand Prix (1968, 1970, 1972, 1974, 1976–1979, 1981)
 Formula Nissan (2002–2004)
 Grand Prix motorcycle racing
 European motorcycle Grand Prix (1991)
 FIM motorcycle Grand Prix (1993)
 Madrid motorcycle Grand Prix (1998)
 Portuguese motorcycle Grand Prix (1987)
 Spanish motorcycle Grand Prix (1969, 1971, 1973, 1975, 1977–1986, 1988)
 GTR Euroseries (1998)
 IMSA European Le Mans Series (2001)
 International Formula 3000 (1986–1987)
 International Sports Racing Series (1997)
 Le Mans Series 1000 km of Jarama (2006)
 Sidecar World Championship (1981, 1991)
 Superbike World Championship (1991–1992)
 Superleague Formula (2009–2010)
 TCR Europe Touring Car Series (2020)
 World Sportscar Championship 360 km of Jarama (1987–1989)
 World Touring Car Championship (1987)

Lap records

The official race lap records at the Circuito del Jarama are listed as:

Notes

References

External links 

Circuito del Jarama at Google Maps

Formula One circuits
Spanish Grand Prix
Motorsport venues in the Community of Madrid
Sports venues in the Community of Madrid
Grand Prix motorcycle circuits
Superbike World Championship circuits
World Touring Car Championship circuits
American Le Mans Series circuits
San Sebastián de los Reyes